Flaveria oppositifolia is a rare Mexican plant species of Flaveria within the family Asteraceae. It has been found only in northeastern Mexico, from Tamaulipas west to Coahuila, south as far as Hidalgo and Aguascalientes. Some sources report the species to be present in the State of Texas in the United States, but the Texas populations have been recognized as a distinct species, F. brownii.

One plant can produce numerous flower heads in a loose branching array. Each head contains 10-15 yellow disc flowers but no ray flowers.

References

External links 
photo of herbarium specimen collected in Nuevo León in 1990

oppositifolia
Endemic flora of Mexico
Plants described in 1836
Taxa named by Augustin Pyramus de Candolle